Martin Sladký (born 1 March 1992) is a Czech professional footballer who plays as a midfield for SK Dynamo České Budějovice.

References

External links
 
 

1992 births
Living people
Czech footballers
Czech First League players
FC Viktoria Plzeň players
FC Silon Táborsko players
Association football midfielders
SK Sigma Olomouc players
Czech Republic youth international footballers
People from Domažlice
SK Dynamo České Budějovice players
Sportspeople from the Plzeň Region